Allenby Driver (29 September 1918 – 31 March 1997) was an English professional footballer who played as an inside forward in the Football League for Sheffield Wednesday, Luton Town, Norwich City, Ipswich Town and Walsall. He began his career professional career at Sheffield Wednesday but the outbreak of war interrupted his progress, he later played for Frickley Colliery.

References

1918 births
People from Blackwell, Derbyshire
Footballers from Derbyshire
1997 deaths
English footballers
Association football forwards
Clipstone F.C. players
Sheffield Wednesday F.C. players
Luton Town F.C. players
Norwich City F.C. players
Ipswich Town F.C. players
Walsall F.C. players
Corby Town F.C. players
Scarborough F.C. players
Frickley Athletic F.C. players
English Football League players
Brentford F.C. wartime guest players